Firishta or Ferešte, full name Muhammad Qasim Hindu Shah Astarabadi, was a Persian historian, who later settled in India and served the Deccan Sultans as their court historian. He was born in 1560 and died in 1620. The name Firishta means 'angel' in Persian.

Life
Firishta was born  at Astarabad on the shores of the Caspian Sea to Gholam Ali Hindu Shah. While Firishta was still a child, his father was summoned away from his native country into Ahmednagar, India, to teach Persian to the young prince Miran Husain Nizam Shah, with whom Firishta studied.

In 1587 Firishta was serving as the captain of guards of King Murtaza Nizam Shah I when Prince Miran overthrew his father and claimed the throne of Ahmednagar. At this time, the Sunni Deccani Muslims committed a general massacre of the foreign population, especially Shias of Iranian origin. However, Prince Miran spared the life of his former friend, who then left for Bijapur to enter the service of King Ibrahim Adil II in 1589.

Having been in military positions until then, Firishta was not immediately successful in Bijapur. Further exacerbating matters was the fact that Firishta was of Shia origin and therefore did not have much chance of attaining a high position in the dominantly Sunni courts of the Deccan sultanates. Ibrahim Adil Shah II of Bijapur had also begun following the policy of bringing Sunni Muslim Deccanis to power and ending Shia domination by dismissing them from their posts. In 1593 Ibrahim Shah II ultimately implored Firishta to write a history of India with equal emphasis on the history of Deccan dynasties as no work thus far had given equal treatment to all regions of the subcontinent.

Overview of work
The work was variously known as the Tarikh-i Firishta and the Gulshan-i Ibrahimi. In the introduction, a resume of the history of Hindustan prior to the times of the Muslim conquest is given, and also the victorious progress of Arabs through the East. The first ten books are each occupied with a history of the kings of one of the provinces; the eleventh book gives an account of the Muslims of Malabar; the twelfth a history of the Muslim saints of India; and the conclusion treats of the geography and climate of India. It also includes graphic descriptions of the persecution of Hindus during the reign of Sikandar Butshikan in Kashmir.

Tarikh-i Firishta consists primarily of the following books:
 The Kings of Ghazni and Lahore
 The Kings of Dehli
 The Kings of Dakhin - divided into 6 chapters:
Gulbarga
Bijapur
Ahmadnagar
Tilanga
Birar
Bidar
 The Kings of Gujarat
 The Kings of Malwa
 The Kings of Khandesh
 The Kings of Bengal and Bihar
 The Kings of Multan
 The Rulers of Sind
 The Kings of Kashmir
 An account of Malabar
 An account of Saints of India
Conclusion - An account of the climate and geography of India

Contemporary scholars and historians variously write that the works of Firishta drew from Tabaqat-i-Akbari by Nizamud-din, Tarikh-i-Rashidi by Mirza Haider and Barani's Tarikh.  At least one historian, Peter Jackson, explicitly states that Firishta relied upon the works of Barani and Sarhindi, and that his work cannot be relied upon as a first hand account of events, and that at places in the Tarikh he is suspected of having relied upon legends and his own imagination.

Legacy 

According to T. N. Devare, Firishta's account is the most widely quoted history of the Adil Shahi, but it is the only source for  asserting the Ottoman origin of Yusuf Adil Shah, the founder of the Adil Shahi dynasty. Devare believes that to be a fabricated story. Other sources for Deccani history mentioned by Devare are those of Mir Rafi-uddin Ibrahim-i Shirazi, or "Rafi'", Mir Ibrahim Lari-e Asadkhani, and Ibrahim Zubayri, the author of the Basatin as-Salatin (67, fn 2).  Devare observed that the work is "a general history of India from the earliest period up to Firishta's time written at the behest of Ibrahim Adilshah II and presented to him in 1015 AH/1606 CE. It seems, however, that it was supplemented by the author himself as it records events up to AH 1033 (1626 CE)" (Devare 272).

On the other hand, Tarikh-i-Farishti is said to be independent and reliable on the topic of north Indian politics of the period, ostensibly that of Emperor Jehangir where Firishta's accounts are held credible because of his affiliation with the south Indian kingdom of Bijapur.

Despite his fabricated story of Yusuf's Ottoman origin, Firishta's account continues to be a very popular story and has found wide acceptance in Bijapur today.

In 1768, when the East India Company officer and Orientalist Alexander Dow translated Firishta's text into English language, it came to be seen as an authoritative source of historical information by the English.

Firishta's work still maintains a high place and is considered reliable in many respects. Several portions of it have been translated into English; but the best as well as the most complete translation is that published by General J. Briggs under the title of The History of the Rise of the Mahomedan Power in India (London, 1829, 4 vols. 8vo). Several additions were made by Briggs to the original work of Firishta, but he omitted the whole of the twelfth book, and various other passages which had been omitted in the copy from which he translated. Edward Gibbon used Firishta's work as one of the sources of reference for Indian history in Decline and Fall.

Works

See also
 List of Muslim historians

Notes

References

16th-century Persian-language writers
Historians from the Mughal Empire
17th-century Indian historians
16th-century births
1620 deaths
People from Gorgan
Emigrants from Iran to pre-colonial India
Historians of India
16th-century Iranian historians
17th-century Persian-language writers
17th-century Iranian historians